Nikolaj Busk Jakobsen (born 14 February 1994) is a Danish speedway rider.

Career
Jakobsen reached four consecutive finals of the Speedway Under-21 World Championship from 2012 to 2015.

In 2015, he began his British league career after he signed for Rye House Rockets for the 2015 Premier League speedway season. The following season he moved to Peterborough Panthers before riding for Berwick Bandits for two seasons.

He rode in the top tier of British Speedway, riding for the Belle Vue Aces and Poole Pirates in the SGB Premiership 2019. In 2021, he returned to Berwick again to ride in the SGB Championship having been with the Scottish team since 2018.

References 

1994 births
Living people
Danish speedway riders
Belle Vue Aces riders
Berwick Bandits riders
Peterborough Panthers riders
Poole Pirates riders
Rye House Rockets riders